Saint Lawrence Gap, Christ Church is one of the best-known neighbourhoods in the country of Barbados. Sometimes just called "the Gap", Saint Lawrence Gap is located on the southern coast of Barbados along the island's Highway 7. Found between Oistins to the east and Worthing to the west, Saint Lawrence Gap features a 1.5-kilometer stretch of bars, hotels, dance clubs, restaurants, inns, resorts, and shops along a white powdery-sand beachfront.  It is situated roughly 5 km southeast of the capital city Bridgetown.

The area was upgraded in recent years as part of the government's Urban Renewal and Development programme. Upgrades included a new boardwalk, street lighting, road paving and re-development of the Dover Beach area (new beach facilities and food and shopping kiosks).

The area has one small church: St. Lawrence by the Sea. There are larger hotels to the eastern end of the neighbourhood, including a Sandals resort and other large hotels such as the Divi Southwinds and Turtle Beach, while the bars and restaurants are to a heavier concentration to the area's western end. There is a small minimarket in the centre of St. Lawrence Gap and one to its eastern end. Scotiabank have a branch in the centre of the resort. To the eastern end of Saint Lawrence Gap, there is a playing field used for football and cricket.

External links

Saint Lawrence Gap - online.
Map of Saint Lawrence Gap
Photography from Barbados: Saint Lawrence Gap

Christ Church, Barbados
Populated places in Barbados
Tourism in Barbados